ABBA Live is an album of live recordings by Swedish pop group ABBA, released by Polar Music in 1986.

History
A live album was something that many ABBA fans had demanded for several years. ABBA themselves had toyed with the idea on a couple of occasions, but always decided against it. Finally, four years after the members went their separate ways, a live collection was released after all. The resultant album, ABBA Live, contained recordings from 1977, 1979 and 1981. The tracks were mostly taken from ABBA's concerts at Wembley Arena in London in November 1979, with a few additional songs taken from the tour of Australia in March 1977 and the Dick Cavett Meets ABBA television special, taped in April 1981.

When this LP/CD was released, the band's popularity was at an all-time low and none of the members themselves were involved in the production of the album. Much to the dismay of both music critics and ABBA fans it also had 80's synth drums overdubbed on most tracks, taking away the true live feeling of the performances. Neither did it feature any of the tracks that the band had performed live on their tours but never included on any of their studio albums, such as "I Am an A", "Get on the Carousel", "I'm Still Alive", or the original live versions of the songs from the 1977 mini-musical The Girl with the Golden Hair: "Thank You for the Music", "I Wonder (Departure)" and "I'm a Marionette", all of which had slightly different lyrics and/or musical arrangements to the subsequent studio recordings included on ABBA: The Album. Several tracks had also been heavily edited, in the case of the 1979 live recording of "Does Your Mother Know" by as much as five minutes since it originally was performed on that tour as a medley with "Hole in Your Soul".

ABBA Live was the first ABBA album to be simultaneously released on LP and CD, the CD having three "extra tracks". The album did not perform very well, internationally or domestically, peaking at #49 in Sweden and only staying in the charts for two weeks. It was remastered and rereleased by Polydor/Polar in 1997, but is currently out of print.

Track listing
All tracks written by Benny Andersson and Björn Ulvaeus except where noted.

Charts

References

External links
  Abba Live on The official ABBA site discography
 Abba Live on Allmusic.com

1986 live albums
ABBA live albums
Live albums by Swedish artists
Polar Music albums